Slap bunting is an offensive baseball and softball technique wherein the batter attempts "to hit the ball to a place on the infield that's farthest from the place where the out needs to be made".

To execute slap bunting, the player is almost always in the back of the left-hand side of home plate, feet slightly open to right field, and choked up slightly on the bat. The moment the pitch is released from the pitcher's hand, the player must rotate his hips toward the pitcher and then cross his back (left) foot over his front foot, moving up to the very front edge of the batter's box. His shoulders should face the pitcher at this point. If the pitch is in the strike zone, the batter should then extend his arms so that the bat is at the correct angle for where he wants to place the ball — the barrel trailing the hands if he wants the ball to go to the left side of the field, and the opposite if he wants it to go to the right.

By already being in the front of the batter's box with the batter's body turned halfway toward first base, the batter already has some momentum toward first base and might be in better position to get a base hit.

The technique is often successful in sacrifice circumstances, where the placement of the ball could help advance a runner already on base. It is also often used when batters are having difficulty getting a hit off of a difficult pitcher, or when they have a better opportunity of getting on base because of the slap bunt than a hit, perhaps because of the player's running speed.

Some advanced players might perform a slap hit, which is the same technique except that the player swings to place the ball in an infield hole or over the infielders' heads.

See also
Bunt (baseball)

References

Batting (baseball)
Baseball plays
Softball